

Deorwulf (died between 867 and 896) was a medieval Bishop of London.

Deorwulf was consecrated between 845 and 860. He died between 867 and 896.

Citations

References

 

Bishops of London
9th-century deaths
Year of birth unknown
9th-century English bishops